Herrera is the name of two distinct railway stations in San Sebastián, Spain.

Herrera station (Euskotren)